Veronica O'Brien  (born 29 January 1971) is a Canadian soccer player who played as a midfielder for the Canada women's national soccer team. She was part of the team at the 1995 FIFA Women's World Cup.

References

External links
 

1971 births
Living people
Canadian women's soccer players
Canada women's international soccer players
Place of birth missing (living people)
1995 FIFA Women's World Cup players
Women's association football midfielders
20th-century Canadian women